The Professional Football Championship was the first competition of the Korean League Cup. It was contested between five K League clubs in 1986.

Table

Results

Awards

Source:

See also
1986 K League

References

External links
Official website
RSSSF

Korean League Cup
Professional Championship